Streptomyces lucensis is a bacterium species from the genus of Streptomyces which has been isolated from soil. Streptomyces lucensis produces lucensomycin A, lucensomycin B, lucensomycin D, lucensomycin E, lucensomycin F and lucensomycin G.

See also 
 List of Streptomyces species

References

Further reading

External links
Type strain of Streptomyces lucensis at BacDive -  the Bacterial Diversity Metadatabase

lucensis
Bacteria described in 1957